Peperomia yanacachiana is a species of plant in the family Piperaceae. It was discovered by Truman G. Yuncker in 1955. He discovered the plant in La Paz, Bolivia.

References

yanacachiana
Flora of South America
Flora of Bolivia
Plants described in 1955
Taxa named by Truman G. Yuncker